The 1988–89 Saint Mary's Gaels men's basketball team represented Saint Mary's College of California in the West Coast Athletic Conference (WCAC) during the 1988–89 college basketball season. Led by third-year head coach Lynn Nance, the Gaels played their home games on campus at McKeon Pavilion in Moraga, California.

The Gaels received an at-large bid to the NCAA tournament, seeded eighth in the West regional.

After the season in early April, Nance departed for Seattle to lead the University of Washington, his alma mater. He was succeeded by UCLA assistant Paul Landreaux, hired a few weeks later.

Roster

Schedule and results

|-
!colspan=9 style=| Regular season

|-
!colspan=9 style=| WCAC tournament

|-
!colspan=9 style=| NCAA tournament

Rankings

References

Saint Mary's
Saint Mary's Gaels men's basketball seasons
Saint Mary's
Saint Mary's Gaels men's basketball
Saint Mary's Gaels men's basketball